The Mal Meninga Medal is the name of the award that goes to the Canberra Raiders' Player of the Year. The award was named after former Raiders captain and coach, Mal Meninga and was first awarded in 2008. Before this there was no name for the award but was still awarded. The medal is awarded to the player that received the most votes during the season, players after each match vote for the best player in the team for the match with the player with the most votes getting 3 points, the next best gets 2, and third gets 1. If the votes are tied at the end of the season the medal is awarded to both players, this has happened only four times, 2005, 2009, 2016 and 2020.

List of recipients

 
Players who have received the medal more than once:
Laurie Daley  = 5
Josh Papalii = 4
Ricky Stuart  = 3
Chris O'Sullivan  = 2
Gary Belcher  = 2
Ruben Wiki  = 2
Clinton Schifcofske = 2
Josh Miller = 2
Shaun Fensom = 2

See also

References

External links
Raiders summaries at raiders.com.au

Canberra Raiders
Rugby league trophies and awards
Awards established in 1982
Australian sports trophies and awards
1982 establishments in Australia